Maria Ilda da Costa Figueiredo (born 30 October 1948 in Troviscal, Oliveira do Bairro) is a Portuguese politician and Member of the European Parliament for the Portuguese Communist Party, part of the European United Left - Nordic Green Left group.

She is a substitute for the Committee on Agriculture and Rural Development and the
Delegation to the EU-Romania Joint Parliamentary Committee.

Education
 In 1973, she was a graduated with an M.A. in Economics.
 In 1998, she entered the Educational Planning and Administration.
 She served as an economist for the Oporto Textile Workers' Union and the Oporto Trade Union Confederation of CGTP.
 She has been a teacher at primary, secondary and university levels.

Career
 From 1979 to 1991, she was a member of the Assembly of the Republic.
 She was a member of Vila Nova de Gaia town council (1983-1991), and member of the Oporto city council.
 Member of the Gaia Municipal Assembly.
 She is a member of the Central Committee of the Portuguese Communist Party (PCP).
 Since 1999, she has been a Member of the European Parliament.

External links
 Profile at the EP group
 
 

1948 births
Living people
Women members of the Assembly of the Republic (Portugal)
Members of the Assembly of the Republic (Portugal)
Portuguese Communist Party politicians
Portuguese Communist Party MEPs
MEPs for Portugal 2004–2009
MEPs for Portugal 2009–2014
MEPs for Portugal 1999–2004
University of Porto alumni
People from Oliveira do Bairro
20th-century women MEPs for Portugal
21st-century women MEPs for Portugal